Vrban is a village in the municipality of Bujanovac, Serbia. According to the 2002 census, the settlement has a population of 123 people, all Albanians.

References

Populated places in Pčinja District
Albanian communities in Serbia